At the University of Cambridge in England, a "Wrangler" is a student who gains first-class honours in the final year of the university's degree in mathematics. The highest-scoring student is the Senior Wrangler, the second highest is the Second Wrangler, and so on. By contrast, the person who achieves the lowest exam marks while still earning a third-class honours degree (that is, while still earning an honours degree at all) is known as the wooden spoon.

Until 1909, the university made the rankings public. Since 1910, it has publicly revealed only the class of degree gained by each student. An examiner reveals the identity of the Senior Wrangler "unofficially" by tipping his hat when reading out the person's name, but other rankings are communicated to each student privately. Therefore, the names of only some 20th-century Senior Wranglers (such as Crispin Nash-Williams, Christopher Budd, Frank P. Ramsey, Donald Coxeter, Kevin Buzzard, Jayant Narlikar, George Reid and Ben J. Green) have become publicly known.

Another notable was Philippa Fawcett. She was educated at Newnham College, Cambridge, which had been co-founded by her mother. In 1890, Fawcett became the first woman to obtain the top score in the Cambridge Mathematical Tripos exams. Her score was 13 per cent higher than the second-highest score. When the women's list was announced, Fawcett was described as "above the senior wrangler", but she did not receive the title of senior wrangler, as at that time only men could receive degrees and therefore only men were eligible for the Senior Wrangler title. The results were always highly publicised, with the top scorers receiving great acclaim. Women had been allowed to take the Tripos since 1881, after Charlotte Angas Scott was unofficially ranked as eighth wrangler.

It was recorded that "virtually every high wrangler (for whom records exist) participated in some form of regular physical exercise to preserve his strength and stamina."

Obtaining the position of a highly ranked Wrangler created many opportunities for the individual's subsequent profession. Such individuals would often become Fellows initially, before moving on to other professions. Throughout the United Kingdom and the British Empire, university mathematics professors were often among the top three Wranglers.

The order of Wranglers was widely publicised and shaped the public perception of mathematics as being the most intellectually challenging of all subjects.  According to Andrew Warwick, author of Masters of Theory,  the term "Senior Wrangler" became "synonymous with academic supremacy".

Past wranglers

Top marks in the Cambridge mathematics exam did not always guarantee the Senior Wrangler success in life; the exams were largely a test of speed in applying familiar rules, and some of the most inventive and original students of Mathematics at Cambridge did not come top of their class. Kelvin was second, Bragg was third, De Morgan and Hardy were fourth, Sedgwick fifth, Bertrand Russell seventh, Malthus ninth, Keynes twelfth, and some fared even worse: Klaus Roth was not even a wrangler.

Joan Clarke, who helped to break the Nazi Enigma code at Bletchley Park, was a wrangler at Cambridge and earned a double first in mathematics, although she was prevented from receiving a full degree based on the university's policy of awarding degrees only to men. That policy was abandoned in 1948.

The present Astronomer Royal, Lord (Martin) Rees of Ludlow, a wrangler, went on to become one of the world's leading scientists, also holding the posts of master of Trinity College (Cambridge), and President of the Royal Society, and being a member of the Order of Merit.

Optimes 
Students who achieve second-class and third-class mathematics degrees are known as Senior Optimes (second-class) and Junior Optimes (third-class). Cambridge did not divide its examination classification in mathematics into 2:1s and 2:2s until 1995  but now there are Senior Optimes Division 1 and Senior Optimes Division 2.

In fiction 
"The Senior Wrangler" is a member of the faculty of Unseen University in Terry Pratchett's Discworld series of novels.
 Roger Hamley, a character in Elizabeth Gaskell's Wives and Daughters, achieved the rank of Senior Wrangler.
 Vivie Warren, the headstrong heroine of George Bernard Shaw's Mrs. Warren's Profession (1893) and daughter of the play's infamous madam, tied with the Third Wrangler, settling for that place because she recognized that "it was not worth [her] while to face the grind" because she did not intend an academic career for herself.
"Wrangler" is a jargon term applied to codebreakers in some of John Le Carré's spy novels, such as Tinker Tailor Soldier Spy.
 Thomas Jericho, the main character of Robert Harris's book Enigma, was Senior Wrangler in 1938.
 In Ford Madox Ford's Parade's End, reference is made to the fact that Christopher Tietjens left Cambridge as "a mere Second Wrangler".
 In Rumer Godden's In This House of Brede, Dame Agnes is noted to have been Eighth Wrangler before entering the abbey.
 In C S Forester's book, The General, a member of the main character's staff (the deputy assistant quartermaster-general, Spiller) is described as a Second Wrangler.
 In Bram Stoker's The Judge's House, the main character Malcom Malcomson is looking for a quiet place to stay whilst preparing his Mathematical Tripos examinations. Mrs Witham, the inn's landlady, warns Malcom about the judge's house, but the charwoman, Mrs Dempster, dispels these fears – explaining she is not afraid of 'bogies' because they are only rats. Malcom replies: "Mrs. Dempster, [...] you know more than a Senior Wrangler! And let me say, that, as a mark of esteem for your indubitable soundness of head and heart, I shall, when I go, give you possession of this house, and let you stay here by yourself for the last two months of my tenancy, for four weeks will serve my purpose."

See also
 List of mathematics awards

Notes

References

 D. O. Forfar (1996/7) What became of the senior wranglers?, Mathematical spectrum 29, 1–4.
 a survey of the subsequent careers of senior wranglers during the 157 years (1753–1909) in which the results of Cambridge's mathematical tripos were published in order of merit.
 Peter Groenewegen (2003). A Soaring Eagle: Alfred Marshall 1842-1924. Cheltenham: Edward Elgar. .
 gives the story about Rayleigh; Alfred Marshall was the commoner who came second to Rayleigh.
 C. M. Neale (1907) The Senior Wranglers of the University of Cambridge. Available online
 Andrew Warwick (2003) Masters of Theory: Cambridge and the Rise of Mathematical Physics. Chicago: University of Chicago Press. 
 a very thorough account of the Cambridge system in the 19th century. Appendix A lists the top 10 wranglers from 1865 to 1909 with their coaches and their colleges.

External links
Information on the wranglers in the period 1860–1940 can be extracted from the BritMath database:
BritMath
Many of the wranglers who made careers in mathematics can be identified by searching on "wrangler" in:
The MacTutor History of Mathematics archive
Cambridge Mathematical Tripos: Wooden Spoons

1748 establishments in England
1909 disestablishments in England
Mathematical awards and prizes of the University of Cambridge
Mathematics education in the United Kingdom
 
 
Terminology of the University of Cambridge